The Elk Range is a mountain range in Mendocino County,  California in the United States.

References 

Mountain ranges of Mendocino County, California